Caroline May Hildreth (born 22 February 1978) is an Australian former competition swimmer who specialized in breaststroke events. She represented Australia at the 2000 Summer Olympics, and also trained for the Australian Institute of Sport, where she was coached by former British Olympic coach and longtime mentor Barry Prime.

Hildreth competed in the women's 200 m breaststroke at the 2000 Summer Olympics in Sydney.  She finished in front of her teammate Rebecca Brown from the Olympic trials, with a FINA A-standard of 2:27.69. After posting a seventh-seeded time of 2:27.60 from the preliminary heats, Hildreth failed to advance to the top 8 final, as she finished her semifinal run with a ninth-place effort in 2:28.30.

References

External links
Profile – Australian Olympic Team 
Athlete's Profile – ABC Sydney 2000 Coverage

1978 births
Living people
Sportspeople from Mackay, Queensland
Olympic swimmers of Australia
Swimmers at the 2000 Summer Olympics
Sportswomen from Queensland
Australian female breaststroke swimmers
20th-century Australian women
21st-century Australian women